Tavoris Javon Hollins Jr. (born August 17, 1997), known professionally as Vory (formerly King Vory), is an American rapper, singer, and songwriter. He won a Grammy for his work on The Carters' Everything Is Love and has released several solo projects including the EP Lucky Me in 2018 and the single "You Got It" in 2019. He gained further recognition for his work on Kanye West's album Donda, which earned him an additional Grammy nomination in 2021. He is currently signed to Capitol Records, Electric Feel Entertainment, and rapper Meek Mill's record label Dream Chasers Records.

Early life
Tavoris Javon Hollins Jr. was born and raised in Houston, Texas, He later moved to Louisville, Kentucky at age 16 to live with his father. While there, he met and began collaborating with singer and Louisville native, Bryson Tiller. He was formerly signed to Louisville-based record label, FPR Music Group.

Career

Vory began his career helping to write songs for American artist Drake and Beyoncé among others. Hollins eventually won a Grammy award for his lyricism on The Carters’ Everything Is Love. 

In 2015, Vory first received attention from the music industry after he was featured on Bryson Tiller's song, "Break Bread", under his former stage name King Vory. He also co-wrote Tiller's, "Don't", which reached number 13 on the Billboard Hot 100 and appeared on Tiller's debut studio album Trapsoul. In 2016, Vory began independently releasing songs, including "Overdose" and "My Life A Movie" featuring Blu and produced by Dun Deal. Later in July 2016, FPR Music Group released his debut mixtape, Overdose.

Later that year he moved to Los Angeles, where he started working on developing his current sound. 
He met Canadian record producer Boi-1da, with whom he would later collaborate on a variety of tracks. In 2017, Vory continued releasing singles, including "Try", "Do That Shit", and "Hold of Me". The latter song was premiered by Zane Lowe on Beats 1 Radio. In 2018, he earned writing credits on numerous songs including Canadian rapper Drake's "Mob Ties" from his fifth studio album Scorpion and American duo The Carters' "Friends" from their collaborate studio album Everything Is Love, which would go on to win a Grammy for his work on the album.

In August 2018, he signed to Capitol Records and Electric Feel Management and released his debut EP, Lucky Me.

He co-wrote and was featured in Rich the Kid's song "Ring Ring" from his second studio album The World Is Yours 2, which was released on March 22, 2019, and on the same day, Vory released a new single, "You Got It".

In June 2020, he signed to DreamChasers and released a self titled EP "Vory".

Vory appeared on Kanye West's tenth studio album, Donda, on tracks God Breathed, Jonah, and No Child Left Behind.

In April 2022, Vory took his talent on a drill track and was featured on ‘Changed On Me’ off of Brooklyn born rapper Fivio Foreign’s debut album, B.I.B.L.E, along with American rapper Polo G.

In June 2022, Vory released his debut album, Lost Souls, which features Kanye West among others.

Discography

Studio albums
Lost Souls (2022)

Awards

References

External links
AllMusic profile

Musicians from Louisville, Kentucky
Rappers from Houston
Capitol Records artists
American hip hop singers
Songwriters from Kentucky
Living people
African-American male rappers
African-American songwriters
1997 births
21st-century African-American people
Dream Chasers Records artists